Yew Tee MRT station is an above-ground Mass Rapid Transit (MRT) station on the North South line in Choa Chu Kang, Singapore, located at Choa Chu Kang Drive near the junction of Choa Chu Kang North 6 and Choa Chu Kang Street 62. Yew Tee station is named after an expunged village that once stood in the area.

The station primarily serves Neighbourhoods 5 to 7 of Choa Chu Kang New Town as well as Sungei Kadut Industrial Estate.

History

The station was built in 1995, together with the other stations of the North South line Woodlands Extension. The two-storey station building, with a simple facade and a kampung-style roof, was officially opened on 10 February 1996 along with the other five stations on the Woodlands Extension. During the construction of the Woodlands extension, land between the Yew Tee and Kranji MRT stations was acquired. Measuring a total of 18,685 m sq, affecting a total of 16 factories operating along the stretch. Initially named Choa Chu Kang North, it was renamed to Yew Tee in 1994.

Following numerous incidents of commuters falling on the tracks and unauthorized intrusions, the Land Transport Authority made the decision in 2008 to install half height platform screen doors for all above-ground stations in phases. The platform screen doors started operations at this station on 1 February 2012.

This station was installed with high-volume low-speed fans, which commenced operations on 27 November that year, together with Kranji station.

References

External links

 
 Infopedia on Yew Tee MRT Station.

Railway stations in Singapore opened in 1996
Choa Chu Kang
Mass Rapid Transit (Singapore) stations